Märta Björnbom (25 May 1888 in Stockholm – 14 July 1973 in Danderyd Municipality) was a Swedish lawyer. She was one of the first women in Sweden to complete a law degree in the early 20th century. She had worked in the law sphere, like being a notary, legal representative, an assistant to a lawyer, then later being involved in many associations; member of the International Law Association, chaired the Swedish Women's Citizens' Union, an apolitical association that worked to achieve gender equality and improve women's conditions.

References

Further reading 
 

1888 births
1973 deaths
Swedish women lawyers
20th-century Swedish lawyers
20th-century women lawyers
20th-century Swedish women